Benning Road is an island-platformed Washington Metro station in the Benning Ridge neighborhood of Northeast Washington, D.C., United States. The station was opened on November 22, 1980, and is operated by the Washington Metropolitan Area Transit Authority (WMATA). Providing service for the Blue and Silver Lines, the station is located in a residential area near the intersection of Benning Road and East Capitol Street. It is the first station after the Blue and Silver Lines diverge from the Orange Line east of the Anacostia River, and also the last station in the District of Columbia going east.

History

In December 2012, Benning Road was one of five stations added to the route of the Silver Line, which was originally supposed to end at the Stadium–Armory station, but was extended into Prince George's County, Maryland, to the Largo Town Center station (the eastern terminus of the Blue Line) due to safety concerns about a pocket track just east of Stadium–Armory. Silver Line service at Benning Road began on July 26, 2014.

Station layout

References

External links

 The Schumin Web Transit Center: Benning Road Station
 Benning Road entrance from Google Maps Street View

Stations on the Blue Line (Washington Metro)
Stations on the Silver Line (Washington Metro)
Washington Metro stations in Washington, D.C.
Railway stations in the United States opened in 1980
1980 establishments in Washington, D.C.
Railway stations located underground in Washington, D.C.
Northeast (Washington, D.C.)